Samuel Patterson House, also known as the Drum House and Kozar House, is a historic home located at Derry Township, Westmoreland County, Pennsylvania.  The house was built in 1846, and is a two-story, five-bay brick vernacular dwelling with Greek Revival-style details. It has a gable roof and two 19th-century Victorian porches supported by square columns.

It was added to the National Register of Historic Places in 1985.

References

Houses on the National Register of Historic Places in Pennsylvania
Greek Revival houses in Pennsylvania
Houses completed in 1846
Houses in Westmoreland County, Pennsylvania
National Register of Historic Places in Westmoreland County, Pennsylvania